Ghostwriter is a children's mystery television series produced by Sesame Workshop and Sinking Ship Entertainment as an original series for Apple TV+, and premiered on November 1, 2019, coinciding with the launch of the service. It is a revival of the 1992–1995 series of the same name. On August 29, 2022, it was announced the third season would premiere in October and would feature a new cast and characters. It premiered on October 21, 2022.

Premise

Seasons 1-2 
Ruben struggles to fit in at his new middle school after he and his mother relocate to live with his grandfather, a recent widower, above the bookstore he owns. Ruben, his classmates Chevon and Curtis, and Curtis's younger sister Donna are at the store one day when they encounter an entity they later dub "Ghostwriter." Ghostwriter communicates with written messages and by creating manifestations of fictional characters, all of which only the four children can perceive.  As they become friends and learn to work as a team, Ghostwriter sends them characters from stories with themes relevant to their lives.

Cast and characters

Main 
 Isaac Arellanes as Ruben Reyna (seasons 1-2)
 Amadi Chapata as Chevon Redmond (seasons 1-2)
 Justin Sanchez as Curtis Palmer-Moreno (seasons 1-2)
 Hannah Levinson as Donna Palmer-Moreno (seasons 1-2)
 Nour Assaf as Samir Yousef (season 3)
 Princess Mapp as Nia Mapp (season 3)
 Daire McLeod as Charli Allen (season 3)
 Josette Halpert as Sydney Allen (season 3)
 Romel De Silva as Oliver Ramos (season 3)
 Tony Ofori as Malcolm (season 3)

Book Characters
 Devyn Nekoda as Alice
 Neil Patrick Harris as The White Rabbit
 Josh Cruddas as The Mad Hatter
 Patrice Goodman as The Queen of Hearts
 Julian Zane Chowdhury as Mowgli
 Aasif Mandvi as Bagheera
 Cameron Brodeur as The Camarillo Kid 
 Andrew Chown as Hitch
 Louisa Zhu as Dale Sweet
 Kiara Groulx as Raine Watson (from The Disappearance of Emily H.)
 Steven Yaffee as Dr. Victor Frankenstein
 Stephen R. Hart as The Monster
 Ess Hödlmoser as Female Monster
 Chloe Ling as Dajie
 Jeff Joseph as Frank Clemons
 Camilla Arfwedson as Sherlock "Shirl" Holmes
 Zoe Doyle as Dr. Joan Watson
 Brett Dalton as Captain Vincent (from the Time Castaways series)
 Chris Diamantopoulos as Owen Quinn
 Kate Drummond as Genevieve Marcus
 Steve Valentine as Jimmy Bones
 Alain Goulem as Sergeant Belson
 Rachel Wilson as Linda Quinn
 Aviv Cohen as Jean Belson
 Jacob Boose as The Scarecrow
 Esther Ming Li as The Tin Girl
 Randall Park as The Cowardly Lion
 Noah Lamanna as The Wicked Witch of the West
 Joshua Zaharia as Leo El Magnifico
 Jay Baruchel as Ralph S. Mouse
 Sydney Kuhne as Rainbow
 Jean Smart as Charlotte
 Iain Armitage as Wilbur
 Darrin Baker as Homer Zuckerman
 Evan Annisette as Lurvy
 Amy O'Grady as The Sheep
 Teresa Pavlinek as The Goose
 Jewelle Blackman as Mami Wata (from Bayou Magic)
 Farhang Ghajar as Khun-Anup

Episodes

Season 1 (2019–20)

Season 2 (2020–21)

Season 3 (2022)

Production

Development 
On September 10, 2019, it was announced that Apple had picked up the revival of the 1992 series Ghostwriter. The series was written and directed by Luke Matheny, and is executive produced by J.J. Johnson, Andrew Orenstein, and Christin Simms.

Filming 
Principal photography and videography of the series commenced in December 2018, and concluded during Summer 2019. Filming took place in Hamilton, Ontario.

Bonus videos 
On March 5, 2021, it was announced that a series of bonus videos called Ghostwriter: Beyond the Page, would premiere on April 1, 2021.

Reception

Critical reception 
On Rotten Tomatoes, season one of Ghostwriter has a 100% approval rating, with an average score of 9.5/10 based on 6 reviews.

Accolades

References

External links 
  – official site
 Press site
 

2010s American children's television series
2010s American mystery television series
2010s American school television series
2019 American television series debuts
2020s American children's television series
2020s American mystery television series
2020s American school television series
American children's fantasy television series
American children's mystery television series
American children's education television series
American time travel television series
Apple TV+ original programming
Reading and literacy television series
Television series about children
Television series about ghosts
Television series by Sesame Workshop
Television series reboots
Television shows filmed in Hamilton, Ontario
2010s Canadian children's television series
2019 Canadian television series debuts
2020s Canadian children's television series
Canadian children's fantasy television series
Canadian children's mystery television series
Canadian children's education television series
Canadian time travel television series
Apple TV+ children's programming